Michael Moore (born May 30, 1994) is an American professional basketball player for Granada of the Liga ACB in Spain. Moore plays at the power forward position.

High school career
Moore played high school basketball at Keenan High School, in Columbia, South Carolina.

College career 
Moore chose to play college basketball at Mount Olive after finishing high school at Keenan High School. During his senior year with the Trojans, he averaged 12.3 points, 5.8 rebounds and 1.5 assists per game, and he was included to the Conference Carolinas All Third-team.

Professional career
After going undrafted in the 2014 NBA draft, Moore was acquired from the Cestistica Civitavecchia of the Serie C Gold. The following year, he joined Svendborg Rabbits of the Basketligaen, where he averaged 15.8 points per game. On June 8, 2018, after a short stint with Cañeros del Este, he joined Borås Basket of the Basketligaen.

The following season, Moore joined the Brooklyn Nets for the Las Vegas Summer League. He then split the 2019–20 season between Virtus Roma and Latina. With Latina, he averaged 11.8 points and 4.8 rebounds per game.

On July 18, 2020, Moore joined Iraklis of the Greek Basket League.

On May 31, 2021, he has signed with HydroTruck Radom of the Polish Basketball League.

On January 8, 2023, Mike Moore joined Covirán Granada of the Spanish Liga Endesa.

References

External links
Proballers bio
RealGM.com bio

1994 births
Living people
African-American basketball players
American expatriate basketball people in Italy
American expatriate basketball people in Denmark
American expatriate basketball people in the Dominican Republic
American expatriate basketball people in Sweden
American expatriate basketball people in Greece
American men's basketball players
Basketball players from North Carolina
Borås Basket players
Iraklis Thessaloniki B.C. players
Mount Olive Trojans men's basketball players
Pallacanestro Virtus Roma players
People from Duplin County, North Carolina
Power forwards (basketball)
Svendborg Rabbits players
21st-century African-American sportspeople